The following is the list of cities in Belarus that underwent a name change in the past.

Most formal name changes in Belarus took place when the country was a member of the Soviet Union (1919-1991).

A problem with namings of Belarusian cities is their being multiple times translated into several languages officially used on the Belarusian lands: Old Belarusian (Ruthenian), Polish, Russian, Modern Belarusian.

A significant wave of "automatical" city renamings followed the annexation of Belarus by the Russian Empire in the late 18th century, when the Russian administration transcribed the names of many cities from Polish language and not from Old Belarusian. Hence, the Russian name of Hrodna was taken directly from Polish language instead of the ancient Ruthenian name Gorodno/Horodno (Городно). The Polish Brześć Litewski was translated into Brest-Litovsk (Брест-Литовск) instead of using the traditional Ruthenian Berestye (Берестье). Most of the Russian-translated names have been put into Belarusian language by the Soviet language reforms of the 1930s.

Besides that, namings of the cities in Modern Belarusian language differ from namings in other languages.

Bieraście → Brześć Litewski → Brest-Litovsk → Brest
Horadnia → Grodno → Hrodna
Mieniesk → Miensk →  Mińsk Litewski → Minsk

Soviet city renamings
Drissa → Verkhnyadzvinsk
Kojdanaŭ → Dziarzhynsk
Prapošask → Prapojsk → Slavgorod → Slawharad
Šaciłavičy → Svietlahorsk

See also
List of renamed populated places in Moldova
List of renamed cities and towns in Russia
List of renamed cities in Ukraine

Belarus geography-related lists
Belarus, renamed
Cities
Renamed
Renamed, Belarus
Belarus